Skorlagad is a genus of ground beetles in the family Carabidae. There are at least four described species in Skorlagad, found on the Indian subcontinent.

Species
These four species belong to the genus Skorlagad:
 Skorlagad cameroni (Louwerens, 1953)  (India and Nepal)
 Skorlagad kornbihanik Morvan, 2007  (India)
 Skorlagad kucerai Morvan, 2007  (India)
 Skorlagad nepalensis Morvan, 1999  (Nepal)

References

Platyninae